Alex Ranghieri (born 18 June 1987) is an Italian Olympic volleyball player.

References

External links
 
 
 
 

Italian beach volleyball players
Olympic beach volleyball players of Italy
Beach volleyball players at the 2016 Summer Olympics
1987 births
Living people
Place of birth missing (living people)
European Games competitors for Italy
Beach volleyball players at the 2015 European Games